Kast or KAST may refer to:

 Kast (furniture), a tall wardrobe-like Dutch chest with double doors. Often used as hope chests, these were constructed so as to partially dismantle for transport to the matrimonial home.
 KAST (AM), an AM radio station in Astoria, Oregon
 KLMY, a radio station (99.7 FM) licensed to Long Beach, Washington, United States, which held the call sign KAST-FM from January 2006 to January 2009
 The ICAO identifier for Astoria Regional Airport in Astoria, Oregon
 Kamusi Awali ya Sayansi na Tekinologia, a Swahili dictionary of terms in science and technology
 José Antonio Kast (born 1966), Chilean lawyer and politician, brother of Miguel Kast
 Miguel Kast (1948–1983), German-born Chilean economist, brother of José Antonio Kast
 Kast, a streaming service that acquired Rabb.it, a similar streaming service, in July 2019.
 Korean Academy of Science and Technology, South Korea's highest academy of science which serves as a national think-tank